Peter Pilipeyko is a retired Soviet and Ukrainian football player.

Career
Peter Komanda started his career in 1994 with Desna Chernihiv, where he played until December 1997. In the season 1994-1995 he played 40 matches and scored 10 goals, where he got 11th place in Ukrainian Second League. In January 1998 he played 10 matches with Slavutich-Chernobyl, where he scored 2 goals. In 1998 he returned to Desna Chernihiv where he stayed until 2000, where he played 36 matches and scored 4 goals. In 2000 he moved to Fakel Varva where he played 16 matches and scored 6 goals and after he ended his career.

References

External links 
 Peter Pilipeyko footballfacts.ru

1968 births
Living people
Footballers from Chernihiv
Soviet footballers
FC Desna Chernihiv players
FC Slavutych players
FC Fakel Varva players
Ukrainian footballers
Ukrainian Second League players
Association football midfielders